The following lists the top 25 singles of 2021 in Australia from the Australian Recording Industry Association (ARIA) end-of-year singles chart.

"Heat Waves" by Glass Animals was the top selling single of 2021 in Australia, spending 6 weeks at No. 1 and 48 weeks in the Top 10, giving the band the record for most weeks in the Top 10 on the ARIA Singles Chart, and being certified seven times platinum. The Kid Laroi had the two highest-selling Australian songs of the year, both of which were certified five times platinum: "Stay" featuring Justin Bieber, which spent 14 consecutive weeks atop the chart, and "Without You" with Miley Cyrus, which topped the chart for a week and spent 29 weeks in the Top 10.

See also  
 List of number-one singles of 2021 (Australia) 
 List of top 10 singles for 2021 in Australia 
 List of Top 25 albums for 2021 in Australia 
 2021 in music 
 ARIA Charts 
 List of Australian chart achievements and milestones

References 

Australian record charts
2021 in Australian music
Australia Top 25 Singles